Stockport bus station in Stockport, Greater Manchester was a bus terminus for approximately sixty-five bus services. It opened on 2 March 1981 on the site of a former car park. Before the bus station opened, most services terminated at Mersey Square.

The bus station was located between Wellington Road (A6) and the Stockport Viaduct, a few hundred metres from Stockport railway station. The main bus station had 24 stands. Two additional stops, one for each direction, were located on Wellington Road, which runs between the bus station and Mersey Square; these were used by through services, including the high-frequency 192 route to Piccadilly Gardens.

In 2014, plans to demolish the bus station and build a new a £42 million transport interchange on the existing site with a connection to the railway station were announced, but these plans were never carried out. In June 2018, plans were announced for a brand-new bus station (Stockport Interchange), that would be constructed on the same site underneath a 2-acre park. Other improved transport links will also be built, including a bridge to the railway station.

On 29 August 2021 at 03:15, all stands at Stockport Bus Station (excluding the two Wellington Road stops) were closed after 40 years of continuous operation, being temporarily replaced by a new small bus terminal off Heaton Lane, as well as several bus stops spread out across Stockport town centre. The new Stockport Interchange facility is due to be completed in 2024.

Services
The majority of services were operated by Stagecoach Manchester with High Peak Buses, Little Gem, Selwyns Travel and  Stotts Tours also using the station.

There were frequent buses running to Manchester, Altrincham, Ashton-under-Lyne, Hyde, Levenshulme, Longsight, Manchester Airport and Wythenshawe plus several parts of the Stockport area including Bramhall, Bredbury, Brinnington, Cheadle, Cheadle Hulme, Edgeley, Hazel Grove, Marple, Offerton, Reddish, Romiley and Stepping Hill Hospital.

Buses were also run from Stockport to Bolton, Buxton, Chorlton, Macclesfield, Hayfield, Poynton, Stretford, Trafford Centre and Sale.

A full list of services is shown below:
Regular services to Manchester city centre are provided by Stagecoach Manchester's high frequency 192 service, which also connects the town centre with Stepping Hill Hospital and Hazel Grove.
Bus 7A runs between Stockport and Ashton-under-Lyne, via Gorton and Reddish. Bus 7B runs between Ashton-under-Lyne and Stockport, via Droylsden and Reddish.
Bus 330 runs between Ashton-under-Lyne and Stockport, via Dukinfield and Hyde.
Bus 11 runs between Altrincham and Stockport, via Baguley, Wythenshawe Hospital, Wythenshawe and Cheadle. Bus 11A runs between Altrincham and Stockport, via Timperley, Baguley, Gatley and Cheadle.
Bus 23 runs between Stockport and the Trafford Centre, via Didsbury, Chorlton-cum-Hardy, Stretford and Urmston.
Bus 25 runs between Stockport and the Trafford Centre, via Burnage, Chorlton-cum-Hardy and Stretford.
Bus 42 runs between Stockport and Manchester city centre, via Didsbury, Withington and Manchester Royal Infirmary.
Bus 197 runs between Stockport and Manchester city centre, via Green End, Levenshulme and Longsight.
Bus 203 runs between Stockport and Manchester city centre, via Reddish and Belle Vue.
Bus 191 runs between Manchester city centre and Hazel Grove, via Longsight, Levenshulme, Stockport and Stepping Hill Hospital.
Bus X92 runs between Manchester city centre and Hazel Grove, via Stockport.
Bus 199 runs between Buxton and Manchester Airport, via Stockport.
Bus 313 runs between Stockport and Manchester Airport, via Adswood and Cheadle Hulme.
Bus 314 runs between Stockport and Offerton, via Offerton Fold.
Bus 322 runs between Stockport and Haughton Green, via Portwood, Brinnington and Denton.
Bus 324 runs between Stockport and Haughton Green, via Portwood, Brinnington and Denton.
Bus 323 runs between Stockport and Heaton Mersey.
Bus 327 runs between Stockport and Denton, via Brinnington and Portwood.
Bus 328 runs between Stockport and Adswood, via Edgeley.
Bus 358 runs between Stockport and Hayfield, via Offerton, Marple and New Mills.
Bus 360 runs between Stockport and Hayfield, via Hazel Grove, Disley and New Mills.
Bus 364 runs between Stockport and Heaton Moor, via Woodbank Park and Bosden Farm.
Bus 368 runs between Stockport and Wythenshawe Hospital, via Adswood, Heald Green and Wythenshawe.
Bus 374 runs between Stockport and Hazel Grove.
Bus 375 runs between Stockport and Mellor, via Marple, Offerton and Stepping Hill Hospital.
Bus 378 runs between Stockport and Cheadle Hulme. Bus 378A runs between Stockport and Grove Lane, via Cheadle Hulme.
Bus 379 runs between Stockport and Heald Green, via Cheadle Hulme.
Bus 382 runs between Stockport and Woodley, via Bredbury and Romiley.
Buses 383 and 384 operate a Stockport circular route. 383 runs anticlockwise via Offerton, Marple, Romiley, Harrytown and Bredbury. Bus 384 runs on the same route but clockwise.
Bus 391 runs between Stockport and Macclesfield, via Poynton and Bollington.
Bus 392 runs between Stockport and Macclesfield, via Poynton and Bollington.
Bus X5 runs between Stockport and Sale.

References

External links

Buildings and structures in Stockport
Bus stations in Greater Manchester
Transport in the Metropolitan Borough of Stockport
Transport infrastructure completed in 1981
1981 establishments in England
Transport in Stockport